Methyl bisulfate is a chemical compound with the molecular formula CH4O4S.  This compound is the mono-methyl ester of sulfuric acid. The significance of methyl bisulfate is that it is an intermediate in the hydrolysis of the important reagent dimethyl sulfate, (CH3)2SO4:
(CH3)2SO4  +  H2O  →  (CH3)HSO4  +  CH3OH

Methyl bisulfate is a strong acid:
(CH3)HSO4   →  (CH3)SO4−  +  H+

Methyl bisulfate came into the public view in 1993 with the discovery that certain mercury compounds catalyze the conversion of methane to methylbisulfate in good yields with excellent selectivity in concentrated sulfuric acid. However, because of the toxicity and concerns with the use of mercury it wasn't until 1998 when platinum complexes were found that catalyze the reaction of CH4 by SO3 and O2 that it came into the limelight:

CH4  +  SO3 + 1/2 O2  →  (CH3)HSO4
This discovery pointed to a possible method for upgrading inexpensive and abundantly available methane (natural gas) into methanol, which is both a more useful chemical and more easily shipped than methane.  The process is proposed to proceed via an intermediate containing the Pt-CH3 group.

Methyl bisulfate's conjugate base is used as a counterion in the formulation of some pharmaceutical drugs, where it is typically referred to as metilsulfate.

References

Methyl esters
Sulfate esters